Mustapha El-Biyaz (also spelled El-Biaz; born 12 February 1960, in Taza) is a retired Moroccan football defender.

Career
El Biyaz played club football for KAC Marrakech in the Botola. He also had a brief "spell" with F.C. Penafiel in the Portuguese Liga during the 1987–88 season.

El Biyaz played for the Morocco national football team at the 1984 Summer Olympics and in the 1986 FIFA World Cup finals.

In 2006, he was selected by CAF as one of the best 200 African football players of the last 50 years.

References 

1960 births
Living people
Moroccan footballers
Moroccan expatriate footballers
Morocco international footballers
1986 FIFA World Cup players
Footballers at the 1984 Summer Olympics
Olympic footballers of Morocco
1986 African Cup of Nations players
1988 African Cup of Nations players
Botola players
Primeira Liga players
F.C. Penafiel players
Moroccan expatriate sportspeople in Portugal
Expatriate footballers in Portugal
People from Taza
Kawkab Marrakech players
Association football defenders
Mediterranean Games gold medalists for Morocco
Mediterranean Games medalists in football
Competitors at the 1983 Mediterranean Games